Yolande Ardissone (born 6 June 1927) is a French painter. Born in Bueil (Normandy), she studied at the Beaux-Arts and at the Académie de la Grande Chaumière in Paris.
She met Jaques Eitel - who was going to become her husband - during a trip in Italy in 1949. Yolande Ardissone and Jacques Eitel had a daughter, who also became a painter known under the name of Florence Arven. Yolande Ardissone exhibited her works in many salons, including the Salon des artistes français.

She was discovered by the art merchant Wally Findlay in 1957 and started exhibiting her works in New York City, Beverly Hills, Palm Beach and other US-based galleries that same year. Yolande Ardissone has gained a considerable reputation. Yolande Ardissone loves to paint Provence, Paris and the French countryside. But her favorite topic is the region of Brittany in western France.

Exhibitions
 Galerie Framond, Paris, 1957, 1959, 1961 and 1966
 Galerie Moyon-Avenart, Nantes, 1970
 Galerie Makovski, Frankfurt, 1955
 Galerie Burrell, New York City, 1963
 Wally Findlay Gallery, New York City, 1966, 1968, 1975 and 1977
 Wally Findlay Gallery, Beverly Hills, 1976 and 1978
 Wally Findlay Gallery, Palm Beach, 1962 and 1978
 Wally Findlay Gallery, Chicago, 1962, 1971,1974, 1976, 1977 and 1978
 Wally Findlay Gallery, Paris, 1973 and 1975
 Galerie Artenoo, Paris, 2006 and 2007

Salons
 Salon d'Automne
 Salon des Indépendants
 Salon des artistes français
 Salon de la Jeune Peinture
 Salon de la Société Nationale des Beaux-Arts
 Salon de la Marine
 Salon du dessin et de la peinture à l'eau
 Greenshields Prize

Awards
 Salon des Artistes Francais, honorary mention, 1949
 Award of the City of Fontainebleau, 1967
 The City of Paris has awarded Yolande Ardissone the Medaille d'Argent.

Notes and references

Bibliography 
 Lydia Harambourg, Dictionnaire des peintres, Ides et Calendes, L'École de Paris (School of Paris) 1945-1965
 Akoun, 2004
 Ardissone, Terre des peintres Collection, 1988
 Bénézit Dictionary of Painters, Gründ, 1999
 Ardissone, Terre des Peintres Collection, 1988
 Ardissone, Arts Graphiques d'Aquitaine publishing, 1979
 L'Encyclopédie Poétique (the Poetry Encyclopedia), Jean Grassin Publishing
 La Jeune Peinture (the Young Painting School), collection Terre des Peintres
 Ardissone, Arts-Documents, Genève, 1969
 La famille autour du monde (the family around the world): Yolande Ardissone, Florence Arven, Jacques Eitel, Ariane Trip, by Ellen D. Strady, 50 pages, Terre des peintres Collection, 2000
 Collector's Guild (lithographies of the artist), New York

External links
 Yolande Ardisson's page on Artnet Pictures of Yolande Ardissone's artworks, Artnet
 Yolande Ardissone Bio - Findlay Galleries 
 Arcade database Yolande Ardissone works purchased by public collections in 1957.

1927 births
Living people
People from Eure
Modern painters
École des Beaux-Arts alumni
French women painters
20th-century French painters
21st-century French painters
Alumni of the Académie de la Grande Chaumière
20th-century French women artists
21st-century French women artists